At Play in the Fields of the Lord is a 1965 novel by Peter Matthiessen. A film adapted from the book was released in 1991. A 2009 audiobook version was read by actor Anthony Heald.

"In a malarial outpost in the South American rain forest, two misplaced gringos converge and clash. Martin Quarrier has come to convert the fearful and elusive Niaruna Indians to his brand of Christianity. Lewis Moon, a stateless mercenary who is himself part Indian, has come to kill them on behalf of the local comandante. Out of their struggle Peter Matthiessen has created an electrifying moral thriller, a novel of Conradian richness that explores both the varieties of spiritual experience and the politics of cultural genocide." --Synopsis from Goodreads

References 

1965 American novels
American novels adapted into films
Random House books
Novels set in South Africa